David James Jones (18 May 1899 – 24 December 1968), commonly known by his bardic name Gwenallt, was a Welsh poet, critic, and scholar, and one of the most important figures of 20th-century Welsh-language literature. He created his bardic name by transposing Alltwen, the name of the village across the river from his birthplace.

Early life
Gwenallt was born in Pontardawe, Glamorganshire, the eldest son of Thomas "Ehedydd" ("lark") Jones and his wife Mary. Conscripted into the Army in 1917 during World War I, he declared himself a conscientious objector and was imprisoned at Wormwood Scrubs before being transferred to Princetown Work Centre in the former Dartmoor Prison until April 1919, an experience he wrote about in his 1934 novel Plasau'r Brenin. In 1919 he enrolled at University College Wales, Aberystwyth, where he met the writer Idwal Jones whose biography he was to write in 1958.

His father was killed by molten metal in the tin works, and this had a deep effect on him. Although his childhood was spent in an industrial area, he was also influenced by the rural area of Rhydcymerau in Carmarthenshire, as he often stayed with relatives there in his youth.

Later life and career
The poem, Y Mynach, won Gwenallt the Chair at the National Eisteddfod of Wales held in Swansea in 1926, and he won the Chair for a second time at Bangor in 1931 for Breuddwyd y Bardd (The Poet's Dream). He was a founder member of the Welsh Academy (Academi Gymraeg) and edited its magazine, Taliesin, from 1961 to 1965. On graduating from Aberystwyth with a BA in Welsh and English, he became a teacher of Welsh at Barry County School and later, in 1927, was appointed as a lecturer in the Welsh language department of the University College of Wales, Aberystwyth but was disappointed not to be made professor of the department to succeed T. H. Parry-Williams. He was the first editor of the literary magazine Taliesin published by the Welsh Academy.

He graduated as MA in 1929 and was awarded an honorary D.Litt. degree by the University of Wales in 1967.

In his youth he regularly attended chapel, but later he embraced Marxism. Still later he changed his opinions and became a Welsh nationalist and a Christian poet. He was an early member of Plaid Cymru.

Christian themes are present in much of his work, not least in Y Coed, which was published following a visit to the Holy Land.

He is buried in Aberystwyth. A memorial plaque was placed on his house, Rhydymôr, Ffordd Rheidol, Penparcau, a village near Aberystwyth, in 1997.

Works

Novels
 Plasau'r Brenin 1934
 Ffwrneisiau 1982

Poetry
 Ysgubau'r Awen 1939
 Cnoi Cil 1942
 Eples 1951
 Gwreiddiau 1959
 Y Coed 1969
 Cerddi Gwenallt: Y Casgliad Cyflawn 2001 (Collected works, edited by Christine James, published by Gomer)

Other
 (ed.), Yr Areithiau Pros (1934)
 (ed.), Blodeugerdd o'r Ddeunawfed Ganrif (1936)
 (ed.), Detholiad o Ryddiaith Gymraeg R. J. Derfel (1945)
 Bywyd a Gwaith Islwyn (1948)
 Cofiant Idwal Jones (1958)

Critical studies
 Allchin, Donald and D. Densil Morgan. 2000. Sensuous Glory  The Poetic Vision of D. Gwenallt Jones. Norwich: Canterbury Press.  
 Edwards, Hywel Teifi. 2006. Making the most of Gwenallt. Cambria. 3. 49. 
 Hodges, H.A. 1975. Gwenallt: an English view of the poet. Planet. 29. 24-29.
 Johnston, Dafydd. 1994. A guide to the literature of Wales. Cardiff: University of Wales Press. Pages 99–101.
 Jones, Gwyn and John Rowlands. 1980. Profiles: A Guide to Writing in Twentieth Century Wales. Llandysul: Gomer. Pages 70–75. 
 Stephens, Meic. 1972. The New Companion to the Literature of Wales. Cardiff: University of Wales Press. Pages 371-373.

References

External links
'Gwenallt' on the BBC Cymru website
'Gwenallt'' on the Ceredigion County Council website

1899 births
1968 deaths
People from Penparcau
People from Pontardawe
Academics of Aberystwyth University
Alumni of Aberystwyth University
Chaired bards
Calvinist pacifists
Welsh Christian pacifists
Welsh conscientious objectors
Welsh-language poets
Welsh-language writers
Welsh scholars and academics
People educated at Ysgol Gyfun Ystalyfera
20th-century British philosophers
20th-century Welsh writers
20th-century Welsh educators